The Ice Age National Scientific Reserve is an affiliated area of the National Park System of the United States comprising nine sites in Wisconsin that preserve geological evidence of glaciation. To protect the scientific and scenic value of the landforms, the U.S. Congress authorized the creation of a cooperative reserve in 1964. The landforms are the result of the Wisconsin glaciation during the last glacial period, which lasted from about 110,000 to 10,000 years ago.

The nine units of the reserve, mostly Wisconsin state parks or other protected areas, are administered by the Wisconsin Department of Natural Resources.  Several units are not yet developed for visitation, having only minimal trails and no interpretive installations.  Planning was underway  for the future development and management of the Cross Plains unit.  Several of the sites are joined by the Ice Age National Scenic Trail, but the reserve is a separate entity. Units of the reserve that charge state park access fees also accept federal passes.

Units

References

External links
 Ice Age National Scientific Reserve–Wisconsin Department of Natural Resources
 Geology of Ice Age National Scientific Reserve

 
Parks in Wisconsin
National Reserves of the United States
Glaciology of the United States
National Park Service areas in Wisconsin
1971 establishments in Wisconsin
Protected areas established in 1971